Errk Oykangand (formerly known as Mitchell-Alice Rivers until 2009) is a national park in Queensland, Australia, 1748 km northwest of Brisbane. Today, this protected area is jointly managed by the Queensland government and the traditional Aboriginal owners, the Kunjen and Oykangand People.

The park has a tropical climate and temperatures exceed 30 degrees Celsius all year round.

Wildlife 
214 species of animals have been recorded in the park, of which 2 are endangered and 211 species of plants.

See also

 Protected areas of Queensland

References

External links
 Mitchell and Alice Rivers National Park, Mitchell River via Kowanyama - Australian Heritage Database
 About Errk Oykangand National Park The State of Queensland Department of National Parks, Sport and Racing.

National parks of Far North Queensland
Protected areas established in 1977
1977 establishments in Australia